Tullinge is a station on the Stockholm commuter rail in Stockholm, near Södertälje, located in the center of the area Tullinge, approximately 19 km from Stockholm C, between the stations of Tumba and Flemingsberg. The station has a central platform with ticket hall on the platform and the entrance of a subway. It opened on 1 June 1969. In 2019, it had approximately 5,600 boarding passengers per day.

References

Railway stations in Stockholm County